Fontenoy is a commune in the Yonne department in Bourgogne-Franche-Comté in north-central France. It lies on the boundary between the natural regions of Puisaye and Forterre. It gave its name the Battle of Fontenoy (841).

See also
Communes of the Yonne department

References

Communes of Yonne